Opak River is a river in central south area of Java island, Indonesia.

Hydrology 

It also passes the historical locations of Plered, Karta, and Imogiri before draining into the Indian Ocean in the southern part of Bantul.

The river runs upon Opak tectonic fault, a major tectonic fault in southern Central Java responsible for major earthquakes in the region..

The river basin that it lies in is significant as the aquifer is in a heavily populated part of Java  One of the tributaries is Oyo River.

Geography
The river flows in the southwest area of Java with predominantly tropical monsoon climate (designated as Am in the Köppen-Geiger climate classification). The annual average temperature in the area is 22 °C. The warmest month is October, when the average temperature is around 26 °C, and the coldest is January, at 18 °C. The average annual rainfall is 2970 mm. The wettest month is January, with an average of 537 mm rainfall, and the driest is September, with 22 mm rainfall.

Gallery

See also
List of rivers of Java
List of rivers of Indonesia

References

External links
 http://www.thejakartapost.com/news/2009/02/16/three-die-floods-landslide-yogyakarta.html

Further reading
 (In Indonesian with English summaries) 

Rivers of Yogyakarta
Bantul Regency
Sleman Regency
Landforms of the Special Region of Yogyakarta
Rivers of Indonesia